An edible item is any item that is safe for humans to eat. "Edible" is differentiated from "eatable" because it does not indicate how an item tastes, only whether it is fit to be eaten. Nonpoisonous items found in nature – such as some mushrooms, insects, seaweed, and so forth – are referred to as edible. Processed items that normally are not ingested but are specially manufactured to be so, like edible underwear or edible packaging, are also labeled as edible.

Edible items in nature
It is estimated that approximately half of about 400,000 plant species on earth are edible, yet Homo sapiens consume only about 200 plant species, because these are the simplest to domesticate.

Edible plants found in nature include certain types of mushrooms, flowers, seeds, berries, seaweed, and cacti. Being able to identify the versions of these plants that are safe to eat is an important survival skill.

Many animals are also edible, including domesticated livestock as well as wild insects, amphibians, reptiles, birds and mammals. Advocates of the increase in consumption of edible insects cite the environmental benefits of being able to raise more food using less land while producing fewer greenhouse emissions. More than 1,900 insect species have been documented as being used for food, including ants and beetle larvae in the diets of some African and Australian tribes, and crispy-fried locusts and beetles enjoyed as street food in parts of Thailand.

Etymology
The term "edible" dates back to the 1590s. It originates from the Latin word "edibilis" (eatable), which comes from the word "edere" (to eat), which comes from the prefix "ed-" (to eat).

References

Food and drink